Raymond A. Dalton (born May 10, 1991) is an American singer and songwriter based in Seattle, Washington. He began his career as a gospel and R&B singer. Dalton gained prominence as the featured artist on Macklemore & Ryan Lewis' 2011 song "Can't Hold Us", which gained popularity between 2012 and 2013, eventually topping the charts in multiple countries including the Billboard Hot 100. The song was certified platinum in the U.S. in April 2013. He has won two MTV Video Music Awards.

Life and career
Dalton's mother is Mexican American and his father is African American. He began singing at the age of 6 on the advice of his music teacher, joining the Seattle Children's Choir.  He continued to sing through high school. He has described himself as a fan of Fleetwood Mac. Dalton spent his senior year in high school listening to Missy Elliott, Amy Winehouse, and Kanye West, according to an interview with MTV News.

Aside from music, Dalton is a tennis player who has worked as a tennis instructor. He gave up teaching tennis following the success of  "Can't Hold Us" to pursue a full-time career as a musician. Dalton sings in the Total Experience Gospel Choir of Seattle, as of 2013.

Dalton's work drew the attention of producer Ryan Lewis, who had heard Dalton's singing on a song for another artist. Lewis reached out to Dalton via Facebook. Dalton soon began collaborating with Lewis and Macklemore in the studio. The first song the trio worked on together was Macklemore's and Lewis' 2011 single, "Wings".

In June 2012, Dalton released his first single, So Emotional, which was mixed by Ryan Lewis. He also announced he was working on his 'own project' to be called The Dalton Show.

Dalton, Lewis and Macklemore created the hook for "Can't Hold Us" in one day. Dalton shot his scenes for the single's music video while on tour in New Zealand in March 2013.

Discography

Singles

As lead artist

As featured artist

Guest appearances

Notes

References

External links
 
 Ray Dalton on Facebook

Living people
1991 births
African-American Christians
American gospel singers
African-American male singer-songwriters
21st-century African-American male singers
American contemporary R&B singers
Musicians from Seattle
American musicians of Mexican descent
American hip hop singers
Singer-songwriters from Washington (state)
Hispanic and Latino American musicians
American male pop singers